The 2022 Dayton Flyers baseball team represents the University of Dayton during the 2022 NCAA Division I baseball season. The Flyers play their home games at Woerner Field as a member of the Atlantic 10 Conference. They are led by head coach Jayson King, in his 5th season at Dayton.

Background 

The 2021 season saw Fordham post a 24–27 (12–4 Atlantic 10) record. The Flyers reached the championship round of the 2021 Atlantic 10 Conference baseball tournament, where they lost to VCU. They did not earn an at-large bid into the 2021 NCAA Division I baseball tournament.

Preseason

Coaches poll 
The Atlantic 10 baseball coaches' poll was released on February 15, 2022. Dayton was picked to finish second in the Atlantic 10.

Personnel

Coaching staff

Game log

Rankings

References 

Dayton Flyers
Dayton Flyers baseball seasons
Dayton Flyers baseball